Sylvin may refer to:

Sylvin Farms Winery, a winery in New Jersey
common name for potassium chloride

See also
 Sylvite, potassium chloride in natural mineral form
 Sylvinite, ore mined for the production of potash